Partido Social Cristiano can refer to:
Christian Social Party (Peru)
Copei
Nicaraguan Social Christian Party
Social Christian Party (Bolivia)
Social Christian Party (Ecuador)